Fourmile Canyon or Four Mile Canyon is a canyon carved by Fourmile Creek.  It is located north of Canon City in Fremont County, Colorado.  

The associated Fourmile Creek or Four Mile Creek is a tributary of the Arkansas River.

The canyon wall is the location of the southern portion of Shelf Road, which is part of the Gold Belt Scenic Byway.

External links 
Gold Belt Byway
Shelf Road tour

Canyons and gorges of Colorado
Landforms of Fremont County, Colorado